Baikuntha Nath Sen  (1843 – 1922) was a Bengali scholar, lawyer and philanthropist. His grandson Amarendra Nath Sen was a judge of Supreme Court of India.

Early life
Sen was born in a Zamindar family of Alampur village in Bardhaman district in British India. His father Harimohan Sen came to Murshidabad in his early years and settled in Bahrampur. Sen completed his study from Krishnath College School in 1858 and entered into Presidency College, Kolkata. He passed B.A. in 1863 and B.L in 1864 thereafter started practicing in the Calcutta High Court and Baharampur Judges Court. Sen was the legal advisor of Cossimbazar Royal Estate.

Career
Sen achieved great popularity as a lawyer and orator. He was the first editor of Murshidabad Hitaishi, a reputed weekly. He was a great patron of modern education and was associated with various social as well as political works. He was one of the top leaders of the Indian National Congress in Bengal. In 1916–17, he was elected Chairman of the Reception Committee of the session of the Indian national Congress held in Kolkata. Sen became the first unofficial Indian chairman of Berhampore Municipality, the then Murshidabad District Board which was established by Montagu–Chelmsford Reforms. Baikunthanath invested money to established Bengal Pottery Works along with Raja Manindra Chandra Nandy.

Honour
In 1920, Sen was appointed a Companion of the Order of the Indian Empire (CIE) and became Roy Bahadur.

References

1843 births
1922 deaths
Bengali Hindus
20th-century Bengalis
19th-century Bengalis
Bengali lawyers
Companions of the Order of the Star of India
Companions of the Order of the Indian Empire
Indian philanthropists
Indian lawyers
19th-century Indian lawyers
20th-century Indian lawyers
Indian social workers
Social workers from West Bengal
Indian social reformers
Presidency University, Kolkata alumni
Indian scholars
19th-century Indian scholars
20th-century Indian scholars